The 1965 Women's Open Squash Championships was held at the Lansdowne Club and Royal Aero Club in London from 14–19 February 1965.Heather Blundell won her fourth consecutive title defeating Anna Craven-Smith in the final.

Seeds

Draw and results

First round

Second round

Third round

Quarter-finals

Semi-finals

Final

References

Women's British Open Squash Championships
Squash competitions in London
British Open Squash Championships
Women's British Open Squash Championships
Women's British Open Championships
British Open Championships
Women's British Open Squash Championships